Filippo Fiumanò (born 23 February 2003) is an Italian footballer who plays as a defender for  club Montevarchi on loan from Juventus.

Career 
On 9 October 2021, Fiumanò made his unofficial debut for Juventus in a 2–1 win against Alessandria coming on as Arthur's substitute in the 65th minute. His first call up ever with the Juventus U23 — the reserve team of Juventus — came on 7 November for a match against Lecco. Fiumanò's debut for the Juventus U23 came on 1 December in a 2–0 defeat against Padova coming on as substitute in the 86th minute.

On 31 August 2022, Fiumanò was loaned by Montevarchi in Serie C.

Career statistics

Club

References 

2003 births
Footballers from Milan
Living people
Italian footballers
Association football defenders
Juventus F.C. players
Juventus Next Gen players
Montevarchi Calcio Aquila 1902 players
Serie C players